Mie Bekker Lacota (born 10 November 1988 in Greve) is a Danish professional road and track cyclist.

Palmarès 

 2003
 National Track Championships
 2nd, Points race
 2nd, Sprint

 2004
 1st, Overall, Vittoria Cup
 National Track Championships
 2nd, Pursuit
 2nd, Scratch
 2nd, Sprint
 1st, Skive
 1st, Silkeborg Viborg og Hammel
 European Track Championships
2nd, Points race
 1st, Sorø
 1st, Holbæk
 1st, Tønder

 2005
 1st, Overall, Vittoria Cup
 National Road Championships,
 2nd, Individual time trial
 1st, Esbjerg
 1st, Hammel
 3rd, Tjejtrampet
 1st, Lyngby
 2nd, Hadsten
 1st, Kalundborg
 1st, Tønder
 UCI World Championships,
 1st, Individual road race

 2006
 1st, Overall, Vittoria Cup
 National Track Championships
 1st, Pursuit
 1st, Scratch
 1st, Sprint
 National Road Championships
 1st, Team time trial (with Trine Schmidt and Anette Berg)
 2nd, Road race
 1st, Ringsted
 1st, Asnæs
 1st, Kolding

 2007
 2006–2007 World Cup
 3rd, Points race, Manchester
 1st, 2007 Omloop Het Volk
 World Championships, Palma de Mallorca
 2nd, Points race
 1s, Svendborg
 2nd, Padborg/Bov CC
 National Track Championships, Ballerup
 3rd, Scratch
 1st, Sprint

Mie Bekker Lacota retired from cycling end of the season 2007.

External links 

Danish female cyclists
Danish track cyclists
1988 births
Living people
People from Greve Municipality
Sportspeople from Region Zealand
21st-century Danish women